Leandros is a Greek surname. Notable people with the surname include:

 Leo Leandros (born 1926), Greek musician, composer, and producer
 Vicky Leandros (born c. 1952), Greek singer

This name means "lion man" in Greek. "leon" means lion, and "andros," a variation of the modern Greek "andras," means man.

Greek-language surnames